Williamsburg order of battle may refer to:

Williamsburg Confederate order of battle
Williamsburg Union order of battle